Thermoniphas alberici, the Alberic's chalk blue, is a butterfly in the family Lycaenidae. It is found in Nigeria, Cameroon, Gabon, the Republic of the Congo, the Democratic Republic of the Congo (Mayumbe, Mongala, Uele, Ituri, Kivu and Tshopo) and Uganda.

References

Butterflies described in 1945
Thermoniphas